The Saigon Institute of Technology is an educational institution located in Quang Trung Software Park, District 12, Ho Chi Minh City, Vietnam.

External links
 Saigon Institute of Technology
 Saigon Technology
Education in Ho Chi Minh City